Uplands is an under construction station on the Airport Link of the Trillium Line in Ottawa, Ontario. It is being constructed as part of the Stage 2 O-Train expansion and is scheduled for completion in 2023. The station will consist of two side platforms and is part of the only double tracked segment of the Airport Link.

References

Line 4 (Ottawa) stations
Railway stations scheduled to open in 2023